Essenza is a heavy metal band formed in Italy in 1993, led by the guitarist Carlo G. Rizzello and his brother Alessandro (bass player). At the beginning, Luca A. Rizzello played drums in the trio. Since 2003 Paolo Colazzo joins the band as drummer. The first two full lengths of the band were sung in Italian and were strongly influenced by traditional hard rock and rock-blues; later, the band adopted English lyrics and switched to a classic metal style that resembles Black Sabbath, Judas Priest and Iron Maiden

 mixed to the speed and the heaviness typical of the Megadeth sound.

Discography

Albums
 2000 - Suggestioni
 2002 - Contrasto
 2009 - Devil's Breath
 2014 - Blind Gods and Revolutions

EP, demo, live
 1996 - Essenza, demo
 1998 - Algoritmo 60, demo
 2007 - Dance of liars, EP

Official videoclips
 2007 - deep into your eyes
 2009 - devil's breath
 2014 - bloody spring

Members

Current members
 Carlo G. Rizzello – Vocals and Guitars
 Alessandro S. Rizzello - Bass
 Paolo Colazzo - Drums

Past members
 Luca A. Rizzello – Drums (1993–2003)

External links
 Official Web site
  Essenza at MySpace
 Essenza at Metal Archives
 Essenza at Spirit of Metal

References

Italian heavy metal musical groups
Italian musical trios